The National Shrine of St. Thérèse overlooks the Lynn Canal in Juneau, Alaska, US. Situated on 46 acres, the site contains a stone chapel, crypt, labyrinth, columbarium, lodge, cabin, and retreat.

History

In 1925, St. Thérèse of Lisieux was named the patroness of Alaska. In the 1930s, the Jesuit priest, Father William LeVasseur came up with the idea of a retreat center in her name. Bishop Joseph Raphael John Crimont provided support for its establishment, buying federal land. Thousands of stones were used to construct the chapel and other structures, which were gathered by volunteers. The first mass was held in 1941. In 1945, Bishop Crimont died and was buried at the shrine's crypt.

In 1953, Bishop Robert Dermot O'Flanagan started The League of the Little Flower to help make the shrine self-sufficient. The shrine fell into disrepair and stopped holding retreats in the 1960s but underwent renovation under the leadership of Fr. James Manske from 1968–69. For financial reasons, the shrine was forced to close in 1985 but reopened the following year after 25 locals came together to save the shrine.

In 1998, the columbarium was built and is open to all Christians who want their cremains placed at the shrine. In 2000, a new cabin was built to commemorate the Great Jubilee, and in 2001, the Merciful Love Labyrinth was built.

On October 1, 2016, Bishop Edward J. Burns announced that the Shrine of St. Thérèse had been raised to the status of national shrine.

References

External links
 
 

1930s architecture in the United States
Buildings and structures in Juneau, Alaska
Roman Catholic churches completed in 1941
Pre-statehood history of Alaska
Roman Catholic national shrines in the United States
Tourist attractions in Juneau, Alaska
Roman Catholic churches in Alaska
20th-century Roman Catholic church buildings in the United States